Solomon Reimann (died c. 1873) was a European Jewish traveler. An account of his travels, Mas'ot Shelomoh, based on Riemann's own notes, was written by Wolf Schur and published in 1884.

External links
Solomon Riemann article in the Jewish Encyclopedia

Jewish explorers
Austrian Jews
1870s deaths
Year of birth missing